Sybille Reinhardt ( Tietze, 20 October 1957 in Pirna) is a German rower. At the East Germany rowing championships in July 1974, she was the youngest winner of one of the national titles at age 16; she won the double scull partnered with Christine Scheiblich. She has competed under her married name since 1980.

References

External links
 

1957 births
Living people
People from Pirna
People from Bezirk Dresden
East German female rowers
Sportspeople from Saxony
Olympic rowers of East Germany
Rowers at the 1980 Summer Olympics
Olympic gold medalists for East Germany
Olympic medalists in rowing
World Rowing Championships medalists for East Germany
Medalists at the 1980 Summer Olympics
Recipients of the Patriotic Order of Merit in silver